Denitratisoma is a genus in the phylum Pseudomonadota (Bacteria).

Etymology
The name Denitratisoma derives from:Latin pref. de-, away from; New Latin noun nitras -atis, nitrate; Greek neuter gender noun soma (σῶμα), body; New Latin neuter gender noun Denitratisoma, a body that reduces nitrate.

Species
The genus contains a single species, namely D. oestradiolicum ( Fahrbach et al. 2006,  (Type species of the genus).; New Latin noun oestradiol, oestradiol; Latin neuter gender suff. -icum, belonging to; New Latin neuter gender adjective oestradiolicum, belonging to oestradiol, referring to oestradiol utilization.)

See also
 Bacterial taxonomy
 Microbiology

References 

Bacteria genera
Rhodocyclaceae
Monotypic bacteria genera